Karen Valentine (born May 25, 1947) is an American actress. She is best known for her role as young idealistic schoolteacher Alice Johnson in the ABC comedy drama series Room 222 from 1969 to 1974, for which she won the Primetime Emmy Award for Outstanding Supporting Actress in a Comedy Series in 1970, and received a Golden Globe Award nomination in 1971. She later went to star in her own short-lived sitcom Karen (1975), and played leading roles in the Disney films Hot Lead and Cold Feet (1978) and The North Avenue Irregulars (1979).

Early life 
Valentine was born in Sebastopol, California, in 1947.  She is of Portuguese heritage, and her grandfather changed the family name from Valentin before her birth.

Career
In 1966–1967, she started her television career as "The Resident Dream Girl" on The Dream Girl of 1967, replacing Beverly Adams from the first weekday broadcast opposite hosts Dick Stewart and Wink Martindale, and during that time, she appeared on another Chuck Barris show, The Dating Game.

In 1969, Valentine won her breakthrough role as a student teacher and then a new teacher on the ABC television series Room 222 with Lloyd Haynes, Denise Nicholas, and Michael Constantine. She was discovered by Gene Reynolds, the director of Room 222, who saw her lip-synching in rehearsal and realized she was funny. She was nominated twice for an Emmy and once for a Golden Globe, winning an Emmy in 1970 for Outstanding Actress in a Supporting Role.

Valentine later starred in her own television series, Karen, in 1975. She played Gidget in the 1969 film Gidget Grows Up, and the title role in the critically acclaimed true story Muggable Mary, Street Cop (1982). Valentine appeared in many other movies for television including The Daughters of Joshua Cabe (1972); Coffee, Tea or Me? (1973); The Girl Who Came Gift-Wrapped (1974); Murder at the World Series (1977); Go West, Young Girl (1978); and Skeezer (1982). Valentine was a semi-regular on The Hollywood Squares from 1971 to 1977 on both NBC-TV and in syndication, often trading quips with Paul Lynde. She guest-starred on many series, including Starsky & Hutch; Baretta; McMillan & Wife; Cybill; and Murder, She Wrote; as well as multiple episodes of The Love Boat and Love, American Style.  She had a starring role in the 25th episode of the third season of the 1985 revival of The Twilight Zone, entitled "Many, Many Monkeys".

Her feature films include Forever Young, Forever Free (1975); Hot Lead and Cold Feet (1978); The North Avenue Irregulars; (1979) and The Power Within (1995). She also has had many leading roles in made-for-television movies.

Valentine has continued to work in television and on stage. She co-starred with John Larroquette in a 2004 Hallmark Channel TV movie, Wedding Daze. She has starred on stage in many productions, including Romantic Comedy on Broadway and National Tour, Breaking Legs Off-Broadway and National Tour, and the Los Angeles production of Steel Magnolias.

References

External links
 
 
 
 

Living people
American film actresses
American television actresses
American people of Portuguese descent
Outstanding Performance by a Supporting Actress in a Comedy Series Primetime Emmy Award winners
1947 births
21st-century American women